Tibor Herczegfalvy (born 17 March 1954) is a Hungarian equestrian. He competed at the 1992 Summer Olympics and the 1996 Summer Olympics.

References

External links
 

1954 births
Living people
Hungarian male equestrians
Olympic equestrians of Hungary
Equestrians at the 1992 Summer Olympics
Equestrians at the 1996 Summer Olympics
Sportspeople from Békés County